The WCW World Television Championship was a professional wrestling world television championship owned by the now-defunct World Championship Wrestling (WCW) promotion.

The title was introduced on February 27, 1974 in Mid-Atlantic Championship Wrestling (MACW), a territory of the National Wrestling Alliance (NWA). MACW, also known as Jim Crockett Promotions (JCP), was purchased by Turner Broadcasting System in 1988, and subsequently renamed WCW. In March 2001, certain assets of WCW were sold by AOL Time Warner to the World Wrestling Federation (WWF, now WWE). As such these assets, including the rights to the WCW World Television Championship, inactive since April 10, 2000, were now WWF property. Before it was known as the WCW World Television Championship (starting in 1991 and continuing until the title's deactivation), it was known as the NWA Mid-Atlantic Television Championship (1974 to 1977), the NWA Television Championship (1977 to 1985), and the NWA World Television Championship (1985 to 1991).

Being a professional wrestling championship, it was won via a scripted ending to a match or awarded to a wrestler because of a storyline. All title changes occurred at JCP or WCW-promoted events. The inaugural champion was Danny Miller, who defeated Ole Anderson on February 27, 1974, in the finals of a tournament. Booker T holds the record for most reigns, with six. Rick Steamboat's second reign ended due to vacancy for unknown reasons. The day on which the reign ended is also unknown, although it is known that the reign began on June 10, 1978, and came to a close sometime in 1980. As such, if the reign ended on January 1, 1980, or any later time during 1980, then Steamboat's second reign is the longest in the title's history, at over 570 days. Five different reigns are tied for the record for shortest reign in the title's history, at one day.

Jim Duggan was the last champion in his only reign. At the time, then-champion Scott Hall did not want to be champion, and after unsuccessfully trying to give the title to Kevin Nash, he abandoned the title by throwing the championship belt into a trashcan on the November 29, 1999, episode of one of WCW's television programs, Nitro. Duggan later found the championship belt in a dumpster on the February 16, 2000, episode of another of WCW's television programs, WCW Saturday Night and named himself champion. The championship was later retired on the April 10, 2000, episode of Nitro, after a storyline reboot by WCW authority figures Eric Bischoff and Vince Russo. Overall, there were 107 reigns shared among 55 wrestlers, with 11 vacancies.

Reigns

Combined reigns

Footnotes

References 
 General
 
 
 

 Specific

World Championship Wrestling champions lists